Faith Brown (born Eunice Irene Carroll; 28 May 1944) is an English actress, singer, comedian and impressionist. She was a star of the ITV impressions show Who Do You Do?, and was The Voice in the TV show Trapped!.

Brown was born in Liverpool and attended St Francis De Sales School, Walton. She was a singer in a vocal group (the Carrolls) with her brothers, and was then for a time a solo singer, before using her talent for mimicry to switch to comedy impressions.

Her 1978 LWT special,
The Faith Brown Awards, in which she appeared as herself as well as impersonating all of the nominees, was a success in the ratings, attracting an audience of 9.8 million viewers.

She has appeared as a guest on Celebrity Squares, Give Us A Clue, Blankety Blank, Punchlines, Bullseye plus several other TV entertainment shows, and the reality show I'm a Celebrity…Get Me out of Here! (2006). She won a TV Times award for 'Funniest Woman on TV' in 1980.

She was the subject of This Is Your Life in 1982 when she was surprised by Eamonn Andrews while appearing as a guest on the ITV entertainment show Game For A Laugh.

She appeared in the 1985 Doctor Who story Attack of the Cybermen playing an alien, Flast, former leader of the Cryons.

Selected television credits

Selected theatre credits

References

External links

45cat discography

1944 births
Living people
Actresses from Liverpool
Comedians from Liverpool
English women comedians
English musical theatre actresses
English soap opera actresses
English impressionists (entertainers)
English television presenters
Musicians from Liverpool
Reality show winners
20th-century English comedians
21st-century English comedians
I'm a Celebrity...Get Me Out of Here! (British TV series) participants
20th-century English women
20th-century English people
21st-century English women